Events in the year 1893 in Spain.

Incumbents
Monarch: Alfonso XIII
Prime Minister: Práxedes Mateo Sagasta

Events
 January 31– Historical American Exposition closes in Madrid
March 5 - Spanish general election, 1893

Births
May 6 - José Calvo Sotelo

Deaths
  Concepción Arenal, feminist writer and activist (born 1820)

References

 
1890s in Spain